San Lawrenz is an administrative unit of Malta, on the island of Gozo. Its name is derived from Lawrence of Rome who is the patron saint for the locality. It has a population of 748, as of March 2014.

The Dwejra nature reserve is administratively part of the town. Prominently in the reserve is the Fungus Rock, and formerly also the Azure Window landmark before its collapse on March 8 2017.

Overview
It is built on a plain surrounded by three hills, Għammar, Gelmus and Ta' Dbieġi. The latter, Ta' Dbieġi, rises 195 metres above sea level and is Gozo's highest point. In the limits of San Lawrenz, there is also the bay of Dwejra, known for its strange geological faults.

The village has retained its traditional and rural lifestyle.

San Lawrenz is one of two Gozitan villages that have taken their name from that of their patron saint. The other is the nearby hamlet of Santa Luċija, Gozo. San Lawrenz was established a parish on 15 March 1893. Before this date, the area was known as Ta' Ċangura. Most probably the site derived its name from a local family name or nickname. The date of origin of this area is not known. However the name Ta' Ċangura can be dated back to before the Siege of Gozo, that is, before July 1551.

Until San Lawrenz was declared a parish in 1893, it formed part of the neighbourhood of Għarb. However, as time went by the people of San Lawrenz started to form a separate community and as a result they wanted their own church. The foundation stone for this new church was laid and consecrated by the Bishop Peter Pace on 21 November 1886. The relic of Saint Lawrence was placed under this stone. Every villager participated in the building of the church.

The village feast of San Lawrenz is celebrated each year, in the warmest part of the Summer, namely around the first week of August.

There is one restaurant, the village shop and the local bar (run by the local football club to raise funds).

With a population of 748 people (as of March 2014), it is the second least populated village on Gozo and third least in all of the Maltese Islands. The village's football team is called St. Lawrence Spurs.

Main roads
Pjazza San Lawrenz (St. Lawrence Square) 
Triq Ta' Ċangura (Ciangura Road) 
Triq id-Duluri (Our Lady of Sorrows Road) 
Triq il-Ġebla tal-Ġeneral (Fungus Rock Road)
Triq il-Wileġ (Open Fields Street) 
Triq San Lawrenz (St. Lawrence Road)

Other streets
Daħlet Pawluzzu (Pauluzzu Lane) 
Pjazza Dwejra (Dwejra Square) 
Trejqa l-10 ta' Awissu (10 August Path) 
Trejqet il-Wilġa Ta' Ġidrin (Gidrin's Open Field Path) 
Triq Dun Salv Portelli (Fr. Saviour Portelli Street)
Triq Għajn Abdul (Ghajn Abdul Street) 
Triq Għar Ilma (Water Cave Street) 
Triq ir-Rokon (Rokon Street) 
Triq it-Torri (Tower Street) 
Triq Nikola Monsarrat (Nicholas Monsarrat)
Triq ta' Bieb il-Għar (Cave's Door Street)
Triq Wied Guno (Guno Valley Street)
Triq Wied Merill (Merill Valley Road)

Twin towns – sister cities

San Lawrenz is twinned with:
 Colle Umberto, Italy

See also 
 Gozo Farmhouses

References

 
Towns in Malta
Local councils of Malta
Gozo